Scotura niveilimba is a moth of the family Notodontidae. It is found in Brazil and Peru.

Etymology
The name comes from a combination of the Latin adjective niveus (meaning snowy) and limbus (meaning border or hem) and refers to the white hindwing margin, a trait that distinguishes niveilimba from Scotura nervosa and its relatives.

References

Moths described in 2008
Notodontidae of South America